Prairie Rustlers is a 1945 American Western film directed by Sam Newfield and written by Fred Myton. The film stars Buster Crabbe, Al St. John, Evelyn Finley, Karl Hackett, I. Stanford Jolley and Bud Osborne. The film was released on November 7, 1945, by Producers Releasing Corporation.

Plot

Cast          
Buster Crabbe as Billy Carson / Jim Slade 
Al St. John as Fuzzy Jones 
Evelyn Finley as Helen Foster
Karl Hackett as Dan Foster
I. Stanford Jolley as Matt 
Bud Osborne as Bart 
Kermit Maynard as Vic

References

External links
 

1945 films
1940s English-language films
American Western (genre) films
1945 Western (genre) films
Producers Releasing Corporation films
Films directed by Sam Newfield
American black-and-white films
1940s American films